Swamp Fox may refer to:

People
 Francis Marion, American Revolution leader
 Marion Campbell, American football player and coach
 Alvin Dark, baseball player and manager
 J. J. Dickison, colonel in the Confederate States Army during the American Civil War
 Mike Patterson (footballer), Australian rules footballer and coach
 M. Jeff Thompson, general in the Confederate States Army during the American Civil War
 Tony Joe White, American musician and songwriter

Other uses
 The Swamp Fox (TV series), a 1959-1961 Disney-produced television series about Francis Marion
 Swamp Fox (roller coaster), located in Myrtle Beach, South Carolina, U.S.
 157th Fighter Squadron, a unit of the South Carolina Air National Guard 169th Fighter Wing 
 Thames Valley Rugby Football Union, North Island, New Zealand
 The mascot of Waycross College, Georgia, U.S.
 "Swamp Fox", a song by Southern Culture on the Skids from the 2004 album Mojo Box